Lucrezia or Lucrecia  may refer to:

Lucrezia (given name): an Italian name, feminine of the Roman name Lucretius. The etymological origin of the name is debatable, but is thought to come from the Latin lucrum, meaning "profit, wealth". Other sources believe it may be of Etruscan origin, though its original meaning has been lost.

People
Lucrezia (singer), Italian singer
Lucrecia (singer), Cuban singer
Lucrezia Aguiari, Italian coloratura soprano
Lucrezia Borgia (1480–1519), the daughter of Rodrigo Borgia, who became Pope Alexander VI
Lucrezia Bori, Spanish opera singer
Lucrezia d'Alagno (1430–1479), close acquaintance of Alfonso V of Aragon
Several women named Lucrezia de' Medici
Lucrezia Galletta (1520s - 1580), Italian courtesan and banker
Lucrécia Jardim (born 1971), Portuguese athlete
Lucrecia Kasilag (1917–2008), Filipino composer
Lucrecia Martel (born 1966), Argentinian film director
Lucrezia Millarini, British TV news anchor
Lucrezia Tornabuoni, Italian political adviser and poet

Fictional characters
Lucrecia Crescent, minor character in the video game Final Fantasy VII
Lucrezia Noin, character from the anime Mobile Suit Gundam Wing
Lucrezia Warren Smith, character in Virginia Woolf's 1925 novel Mrs Dalloway
Lucrecia "Lu" Montesinos Hendrich in Netflix's Original series Élite (TV series)
Lucrezia Mongfish, character in the comic series Girl Genius

Other
Lucrezia (opera), a 1937 opera by Ottorino Respighi

See also
Lucrezia Borgia (disambiguation)
Lucretia, legendary figure in the history of the Roman Republic
Lucretia (disambiguation) for other uses

Italian feminine given names